David is a 1988 American made-for-television drama film dramatizing the true story of a child named David Rothenberg who was burned by his father. It co-starred Matthew Lawrence as David, Bernadette Peters as his mother, and John Glover as his father. It aired on ABC.

Plot
The film is based on a book written by Marie Rothenberg and Mel White and relates the true story of David, a child who was burned over 90 percent of his body by his father. The parents were estranged and the non-custodial father, Charles Rothenberg, fled with David in tow to California, but quickly decided that he could not care for David alone. However, rather than return David to his mother's care, the elder Rothenberg used kerosene to set fire to his son while the boy slept in a hotel room. The movie shows how his mother, Marie Rothenberg, coped with the crisis, and the courage and determination of David.

Cast

 Bernadette Peters as Marie Rothenberg
 John Glover as Charles Rothenberg
 Matthew Lawrence as David Rothenberg
 Dan Lauria as John
 George Grizzard as Dr. Achauer

Source: AllMovie

Responses
In his review, John J. O'Connor wrote: "David can indeed be painful at certain moments but, in the end, its message about going beyond surface appearances comes through admirably."

Awards and nominations
 Emmy Awards
Outstanding Achievement in Makeup for a Miniseries or a Special (nominated)
Outstanding Drama/Comedy Special (nominated)
Outstanding Sound Editing for a Miniseries or a Special (nominated)

 Young Artist Award
Best Family TV Special (nominated)
Best Young Actor in a Special, Pilot, Movie of the Week or Mini-Series-Matthew Lawrence (nominated)

References

External links
 

Films directed by John Erman
1988 television films
1988 films
American drama television films
Films scored by Marvin Hamlisch
American films based on actual events
Films set in 1983
ABC Motion Pictures films
ITC Entertainment films
1980s English-language films
English-language drama films